Rockingham Dragway is an American auto racing facility, opened in 1970. It is located in Rockingham, North Carolina. The drag racing venue has a capacity of 30,000.

References

Motorsport venues in North Carolina
NHRA Division 1 drag racing venues